Because of its abundant natural resources, there was little need for foreign aid to Venezuela until it was hit by an economic crisis in 1989. From 1994 to 2002, the European Union (EU) committed €130 million. European aid is focusing on technical and financial cooperation projects in the areas of education, health, prison conditions, regional development, environment, and the fight against narcotics. A total of €63.8 million has been earmarked for Venezuela for the period 2000–2006 for technical and financial co-operation and rehabilitation and reconstruction.

Venezuela currently is not receiving any major foreign aid from the United States. In response to heavy rains, landslides and persistent flooding in the north-central region of Venezuela that began on February 7, 2005, the U.S. Agency for International Development’s Office of Foreign Disaster Assistance provided US$50,000 through the U.S. Embassy in Caracas to the Venezuelan Red Cross for the purchase and distribution of emergency relief items.

Aid background 

As the wealthiest country in Latin America and an OPEC member, Venezuela has been more frequently a donor than a recipient of foreign assistance. The United States stopped providing aid to Venezuela in the mid-1960s; nor did any bilateral development agency give Venezuela assistance. Instead, Venezuela's bilateral economic relations were characterized by technical cooperation agreements, student exchange programs, or commercial accords similar to those signed by the major industrial nations. Its oil wealth in the 1970s, however, did allow the country to become a major provider of bilateral and multilateral financing. From 1974 to 1981, the nation contributed US$7.3 billion to international development, 64 percent of which went to multilateral sources, such as the United Nations Special Fund, the Andean Reserve Fund, the OPEC Fund, the Coffee Stabilization Fund, the Caribbean Development Bank, and the Central American Bank for Integration, among others. In addition, Caracas was the headquarters of the affiliates or institutes of many regional and international organizations. Total annual contributions in the late 1970s averaged 1.88 percent of GDP, above the 1 percent level suggested by the United Nations for developed countries. Most bilateral assistance, funneled through the FIV, went to Andean nations, Central America, and the Caribbean. Venezuela used this oil wealth to enlarge its profile in regional and international affairs, a prestige it aggressively sought.

As its prosperity eroded in the 1980s, Venezuela saw its role as a donor, particularly as a bilateral one, wane. The country's most prominent economic assistance during the decade was dispensed through the joint San José Accord that it administered along with Mexico in order to provide subsidized oil to the Caribbean Basin region. Throughout the decade, Venezuela remained disposed to intervene in Central America. After supporting the Sandinista National Liberation Front (Frente Sandinista de Liberación Nacional—FSLN) against the Somoza dictatorship in Nicaragua in 1979, the Venezuelan government also provided financial assistance to the Sandinistas' opposition, the National Opposition Union (Unión Nacional Oppositora—UNO), in its successful bid for power in 1990. Some minimal bilateral funding through the FIV continued in the early 1990s, mainly to promote the country's commercial interests.

In the 1980s, however, Venezuela sought funds from the major multilaterals, such as the World Bank and the IMF, after more than a decade of detachment. The World Bank was active in Venezuela from 1961 to 1974, disbursing thirteen loans worth US$340 million. Because of its high per capita income, however, Venezuela did not become eligible for World Bank financing until 1986. In 1989 it received over US$700 million in the form of a structural adjustment loan and a trade reform loan. Venezuela also used its large and previously untapped reserves at the IMF in 1989, when the IMF disbursed the first installment of a threeyear Extended Fund Facility in the amount of US$4.8 billion. These new funds helped ease the country's painful transition to a more open economy, a transition undertaken largely on the advice of the IMF and the World Bank. Another multilateral agency, the Inter-American Development Bank (IDB), also continued to fund Venezuela's development in highway construction, forestry programs, water and sanitation projects, mining, and other infrastructure projects. In cumulative terms, the IDB provided approximately US$1.3 billion from 1961 to 1990.

The economic reforms begun by the Pérez administration in 1989 tracked with the prevailing liberal orthodoxy of international economics, but flew in the face of traditional Venezuelan state intervention.

During the presidential crisis

23 February attempt 

During the presidential crisis between the Venezuelan governments of Nicolás Maduro and Juan Guaidó, a coalition of Colombia, Brazil, the United States and the Netherlands attempted to bring essential goods as a response to shortages in Venezuela.

On 23 February, trucks with humanitarian aid attempted to enter Venezuela; the attempts mostly failed. At the Colombia–Venezuela border, the caravans were tear-gassed or shot at with rubber bullets by Venezuelan personnel. The National Guard repressed demonstrations on the Brazilian border and colectivos attacked protesters near the Colombian border, leaving at least four dead, and more than 285 injured.

During coronavirus pandemic 

During the COVID-19 pandemic, the first two patients with the novel coronavirus disease was confirmed on Venezuela on 13 March 2020.

References

Foreign relations of Venezuela
Economy of Venezuela
Venezuela